Nasser Hassan Al Malki (born 30 November 1983 in Doha) is a Qatari motorcycle racer.

Career statistics

Grand Prix motorcycle racing

By season

Races by year
(key)

Supersport World Championship

Races by year
(key) (Races in bold indicate pole position) (Races in italics indicate fastest lap)

References

External links

Living people
1983 births
Qatari motorcycle racers
Moto2 World Championship riders
People from Doha
Supersport World Championship riders